is a village located in Gunma Prefecture, Japan. , the village had an estimated population of 7,228 in 2751 households, and a population density of 110 persons per km².

Geography
Located in central Gunma, Shōwa is on the northwestern slopes of Mt. Akagi, it is surrounded on the north, east, and west by the city of Numata and borders Shibukawa to the south. The Katashina River and the Tone River flow through the village.

Surrounding municipalities
Gunma Prefecture
 Numata
 Shibukawa

Climate
Shōwa has a Humid continental climate (Köppen Cfa) characterized by warm summers and cold winters with heavy snowfall.  The average annual temperature in Shōwa is 10.4 °C. The average annual rainfall is 1589 mm with September as the wettest month. The temperatures are highest on average in August, at around 23.0 °C, and lowest in January, at around -1.6 °C.

Demographics
Per Japanese census data, the population of Shōwa has been in decline over the past 60 years.

History
The area of present-day Shōwa was part of the tenryō holdings in Kōzuke Province administered directly by the Tokugawa shogunate during the Edo period. On April 1, 1889 with the creation of the modern municipalities system after the Meiji Restoration, Kuroho and Itonose villages were established within Kitaseta District, Gunma. In 1896, Kitaseta District and a portion of Agatsuma District were transferred to Tone District, The two villages merged on November 1, 1958 to form Shōwa.

Government
Shōwa has a mayor-council form of government with a directly elected mayor and a unicameral village council of 12 members. Shōwa, together with the other municipalities in Tone District, contributes one member to the Gunma Prefectural Assembly. In terms of national politics, the town is part of Gunma 1st district of the lower house of the Diet of Japan.

Economy
Traditionally, the economy of Shōwa was heavily dependent on agriculture; primarily market gardening.

Education
Shōwa has three public elementary schools and one public middle school operated by the village government. The village does not have a high school.

Transportation

Railway
Shōwa does not have any passenger railway service.

Highway
  – Akagi-Kōgen SA, Shōwa IC

References

External links

Official Website 

Villages in Gunma Prefecture
Shōwa, Gunma